UFC 242: Khabib vs. Poirier  was a mixed martial arts pay-per-view event produced by the Ultimate Fighting Championship that was held on September 7, 2019 at The Arena, Yas Island in Abu Dhabi, United Arab Emirates.

Background
The event marked the promotion's third visit to Abu Dhabi and first since UFC Fight Night: Nogueira vs. Nelson in April 2014.

A UFC Lightweight Championship title unification bout between current champion Khabib Nurmagomedov and interim champion Dustin Poirier served as the event's headliner.

A lightweight bout between Magomed Mustafaev and Don Madge was scheduled for the event. However, on August 18, it was reported that Mustafaev was removed from the bout for undisclosed reasons. Madge then faced promotional newcomer Farès Ziam.

Adam Yandiev was scheduled to face promotional newcomer Punahele Soriano at the event. However, Yandiev pulled out of the bout in mid-August citing a knee injury and the bout was scrapped.

A bantamweight bout between Khalid Taha and Bruno Gustavo da Silva  was scheduled for the event. However, on August 21, it was reported that the bout was moved to UFC 243.

At the weigh-ins, Sarah Moras weighed in at 138 pounds, 2 pounds over the bantamweight non-title fight limit of 136. She was fined 20% of her purse and her bout with Liana Jojua proceeded at a catchweight.

Results

Bonus awards
The following fighters received $50,000 bonuses.
Fight of the Night: No bonus awarded.
Performance of the Night: Khabib Nurmagomedov, Ottman Azaitar, Belal Muhammad and Muslim Salikhov

Viewership
As of September 4, 2019 online promotional content related to UFC 242, uploaded to online streaming platforms including YouTube, Facebook and Instagram prior to the fight, has received a collective total of more than 112million views.

In Russia, where it was broadcast by the free TV station Channel One Russia, the fight drew approximately 26million viewers, equivalent to 24% of Russia's adult population.

See also 

 List of UFC events
 2019 in UFC
 List of current UFC fighters

References 

Ultimate Fighting Championship events
2019 in mixed martial arts
Mixed martial arts in the United Arab Emirates
Sports competitions in Abu Dhabi